Nenad Šestan (born 1970 in Zadar, Croatia) is Harvey and Kate Cushing Professor of Neuroscience and professor of comparative medicine, genetics and psychiatry at the Yale School of Medicine. He received his MD from the School of Medicine, University of Zagreb in 1995 and his PhD from Yale School of Medicine in 1999.

Šestan and his research were profiled in The New York Times in July 2019. In 2019, he appeared in Nature's 10, a yearly list of "ten people who mattered in science" compiled by the scientific journal Nature.
Šestan is a member of HAZU.

References

External links
Nenad Sestan on YouTube
Nenad Sestan on ResearchGate

1971 births
Living people
School of Medicine, University of Zagreb alumni
Yale School of Medicine alumni
Yale School of Medicine faculty
Croatian neuroscientists
Croatian psychiatrists
Faculty of Science, University of Zagreb alumni
Members of the National Academy of Medicine